Danila Alekseyevich Molodnyakov (born 4 January 2002) is a Russian football player who plays for FC Chertanovo Moscow.

Club career
He made his debut in the Russian Football National League for FC Chertanovo Moscow on 8 August 2020 in a game against FC Tom Tomsk, he substituted Dmitri Redkovich in added time.

References

External links
 
 Profile by Russian Football National League

2002 births
Sportspeople from Krasnodar Krai
People from Krymsk
Living people
Russian footballers
Russia youth international footballers
Association football defenders
FC Chertanovo Moscow players